Kolana Rock is a prominent granite dome located along the southern edge of Hetch Hetchy Valley in Yosemite National Park. John Muir stated that Kolana was the Indian name for the rock.

The dome was closed to rock climbing for many years during the breeding season of the Peregrine Falcon. The closure was lifted in 2013.

References

External links

Mountains of Tuolumne County, California
Rock formations of California
Granite domes of Yosemite National Park